Ancoraimes (Aymara: Janq'u Laymi) is the second municipal section of the Omasuyos Province in the  La Paz Department, Bolivia. Its seat is Ancoraimes (Janq'u Laymi).

Geography 
Some of the highest mountains of the district are listed below:

References 

 www.ine.gov.bo / census 2001: Ancoraimes Municipality

External links 
 Map of the Pedro Domingo Murillo Province

Municipalities of La Paz Department (Bolivia)